Rubinow is a surname. Notable people with the surname include:

Barry Rubinow (born 1956), American film executive and editor
I. M. Rubinow (1875–1936), Russian theorist on social insurance

See also
Rubinówka, a location in Poland
Robinow syndrome, a genetic disorder